Joachim Cronman (c.1640 – March 5, 1703) was an owner of estates in Livonia and a colonel for the Swedish Empire. He was the Commandant of the Neumünde redoubt/fortlet (skans in Swedish).

Biography
Joachim Cronman was the son of Hans Detterman Cronman (1590–c1645) and was born around 1640.

Hans was the war commissar for the Swedish Empire.  Hans had been knighted as Lord Cronman by Christina, Queen of Sweden on March 9, 1638. He became Lord of Alatskivi Castle in Swedish Livonia in 1642.

Joachim's mother was Ursula Kordes (1600–1675), and she was the daughter of Joakim Kordes and Ursula Gantschau.

His brother was Fritz Cronman and his sisters were Elisabeth Cronmann who married captain Johann Schulmann, landlord of Nova-Bura in Ingria; and Anna Catharina Cronman I (1620–1685) who married Frans von Knorring (1626–1694).

Joachim Cronman attended the University of Tartu. He married Lunetta Makeléer (1639–1693) on August 9, 1657, in Göteborg, Sweden. Lunetta was the daughter of Hans Makeléer, 1st Baronet who was the Lord of Gåsevadholm, and Hageby in Sweden.

Together, Cronman and his wife had the following children:
Ursula Cronman (1660–1745), she married Christoffer Fredrik von Grothenhielm (1655–1705).
Anna Catharina Cronman II (c.1661–1661), who died as an infant
Johan Cronman (1662–1737), he became Governor of Malmö.
Hedvik Elisabeth Cronman (1663–1699) who married Henrik Aminoff (1653–?). After her husband's death she married Simon von Rohr (c1650–1721).
Anna Catharina Cronman III (c.1660–1685) married Captain Hans Christoffer von Rohr (1627-c.1712) and had as their child: Joachim von Rohr (1678–1757), a lieutenant colonel and commandant of the Dalarö fortress. Hans Christoffer von Rohr I was killed in action in the Battle of Narva.
Eva Maria Cronman (1675–1706) who married rittmeister Arend Wilhelm von Rehbinder (?–1711), lord of the Jõesse manor in Martna Parish.

Cronman became a colonel on January 23, 1679. He was later stationed at the Narva fortress. On March 10, 1685, he was assigned to the Savolaks and Nyslott regiment. He later served as commandant of the Neumünde fortress. He died on March 5, 1703, at Neumünde.

Hans Detterman Cronman, Lord Cronman, (died after 2 September 1645) near Riga, Latvia was married to Ursula Kordes (died 1675), daughter of Joakim Kordes and Ursula Gantschau. They had the following children:
 Vilhelm Cronman, died in battle unmarried 20 August 1656 at Bertholdshof, near Riga.
 Johan Cronman, died unmarried in battle in Preussia.
 Anna Catharina Cronman I (1620–?)died after 1688 married Colonel Frans von Knorring (died after 1688).
 Joachim Cronman, died 5 March 1703 at the Neumünde fortress, married 9 August 1657 Lunetta Makeleer in Gothenburg. She was buried 22 February 1693 at Reval. She was the daughter of John Hans Makeléer and Anna Gubbertz.
 Anna Catharina Cronman II, died 1661 Gothenburg, buried 23 December 1661 Kristine parish, Gothenburg.
 Ursula Cronman, born 29 August 1660, died 27 September 1745, married 1 July 1680 at Dorpat to Captain Christoffer Fredrik von Grothenhielm (born 1655, died 1705).
 Carl Cronman, born 1661, died young in France.
 Johan Cronman, Baron Cronman, born 2 February 1662 at Unanitz, Ingermanland, died unmarried 26 July 1737 Malmö.
 Hedvig Elisabet Cronman, born 11 November 1663, died 14 August 1699, married 1stly Henrik Aminoff (born 1653); she married 2ndly Simon von Rohr (died 1721).
 Jakob Fredrik Cronman, died 1710 at Reval from the plague.
 Anna Catharina Cronman III, possibly born 3 February 1667, died 3 December 1685 during childbirth, married Captain Hans Christoffer von Rohr (born 1627, died about 1712). However, if born in 1667 Joachim could not be her son, she would be just 11 years old at his birth.
 Joachim von Rohr (January 23, 1678 – September 9, 1757) was a lieutenant colonel for the Swedish Empire and commandant of the Dalarö fortress. He participated in the Battle of Poltava and was captured and held as a prisoner in Siberia. Joachim married Catharina Charlotta Klingenberg (1680–1758) on February 4, 1699 (old style) in Sweden. Together they had the following children:
 Anna Elisabeth von Rohr (1700–1744) who married Anders Örbom (1675–1740), who was a captain in the Swedish Army. Örbom was born in Örebro, Sweden on May 9, 1675. His father was a man named Brask, who was a District Court Judge in Örebro. Anders joined the military in 1691 and he took part in the campaign at Humlebäck on Zealand, a Danish island where Copenhagen is located, in 1700. On July 7, 1701, he left camp and on July 9, 1701, he crossed the Düna River in Riga in Ukraine. There they conquered the Saxony troops and took about 700 prisoners. He fought in the Battle of Klissow on July 7, 1702, and the Battle of Pułtusk on April 21, 1703. He participated in the Battle of Reusch-Lemberg in 1704, and the Battle of Fraustadt on February 3, 1706, and was promoted to lieutenant with Jämtland's rifle regiment. He participated on July 4, 1708, in the Battle of Holowczyn. He was wounded with a bullet to the face. The bullet remained lodged in his skull the remainder of his life. He also participated in the Battle of Lakowitz. He was captured on the Dnieper River, in Ukraine on July 1, 1709, and was taken to Siberia as a prisoner-of-war along with other officers during the Surrender at Perevolochna. All the soldiers were executed, and the officers were imprisoned in Siberia. He married Anna Elisabeth Von Rohr (1701–1744) on September 5, 1719, in Solikamsk, Siberia, Russia. Together Anders and Anna Elisabeth had their first child in Siberia. Captain Anders Örbom died on May 25, 1740, and he was buried in Rödön, Sweden on June 5, 1740. At the war's end, Joachim and his family were allowed to return to Sweden.
Carl Joachim Örbom (1721–1810) who was a Captain of the Swedish Army who married Beata Dorothea Von Saltza (1721–1764) on July 11, 1754, and after her death remarried
Erik Johan Örbom (1723–1802) who was a major in the Jämtland Regiment who married Helena Ruuth (1729–1802)
Anna Catharina Örbom (1725)
Gustaf Örbom I (1728–1730)
Charlotta Örbom (1730–?)
Gustaf Örbom II (1732–1807) who was a captain in the Swedish Army who married Sophia Lovisa Winnberg (1744–1807)
Christopher Örbom (1735–1828) who was a captain in the Swedish Army who married E. M. Sundström (1736–?)
Sara Elisabeth Örbom (1736–?)
Petrus Örbom (1738–?) who was a lieutenant in the Swedish Army
 Lucia Dorotea von Rohr (1702)
 Lunetta von Rohr II (1704–1764) who married Gustaf Adolf Clodt (1692–1738) a Baron
 Helena von Rohr (1706–1780)
 Hans Christoffer von Rohr III (1708–1790)
 Brita Maria Von Rohr (1711–1762) who married Herman Ross (1707–1777)
 Magnus Joakim von Rohr (1710–1722)
 Catharina Charlotta von Rohr (1714–1784) who married Jacob Daniel Mether (1718–1769)
 Christina Dorothea Von Rohr (1717–1800)
 Gustaf Johan Von Rohr (1723–1739)
 Maria Margareta von Rohr (1725–1778) who married Gustaf Mannerstedt (1713–1756).
 Gustaf Vilhelm Cronman, christened 13 July 1668 Gothenburg, died 1710 at Dünamünde from the plague. He married Catharina × of Colmar (died 1710 Dünamünde from the plague).
 Joachim Cronman II, born 1699 in Livonia, died 1 December 1745, married Anna Elisabet Renhorn (born 1704, died 6 January 1764), daughter of Commander Hans Renhorn.
 Hans Vilhelm Cronman, born 1722, died 1754, married 1 July 1744 Anna Augusta von Stackelberg (born 1725).
 Augusta Elisabet Cronman, born 7 May 1745, died 1752.
 Eufrosyne Charlotte Cronman, born 8 June 1746, married 1765 Carl Ludvig von Brackel (born 1744).
 Joakim Fredrik Cronman, born 9 October 1747, died possibly 1773 Russia, married a Stoffel.
 Cronman, a daughter who died young.
 Vilhelmina Juliana Cronman, born 3 October 1748, died 14 January 1810, married 1stly 2 October 1763 Herman Carl von Bellingshausen (born 1724, died 1775), and 2ndly 27 September 1779 Major Henrik Johan von Schröder.
 Otto Gustaf Cronman, born 1 January 1750 at Allatzkiwwi, married 9 August 1778 St. Petersburg, Russia Anna Catharina von Hallberg, daughter of Artur Casper Carl von Hallberg.
 Barbara Appolonie Cronman, christened 21 July 1779 in St. Petersburg, Russia.
 Johan August Cronman, christened 14 February 1782 in St. Petersburg, Russia.
 Natalie Cronman, christened 4 February 1784 in St. Petersburg, Russia.
 Alexei Cronman, born 16 January 1790, married Amalie von Löwen.
 Nadine Caroline Cronman (1831–1875), born 22 July 1831 at Brest Litovsk, died 14 March 1875 unmarried at St. Petersburg, Russia.
 Alexei Cronman (1834–?), born 25 November 1834.
 Carl Reinhold Cronman (1751–1752), born 7 October 1751, died 15 January 1752.
 Christina Cronman.
 Lunetta Cronman.
 ChristinaCronman, married Lieutenant-Colonel Joakim Georg von Rosen.
 Magnus Cronman (c1670–1710), died 1710 from the plague.
 David Cronman, died unmarried at Riga.
 Eva Maria Cronman (1675–1706), born 1675, died 1706, married Arendt Wilhelm von Rehbinder.
 Elisabet Cronman (c1655–1687), died about Christmas 1687, married Captain Johan Gustaf Schulman.
 Ursula Cronman (c1655–1688), died before 1688, married Christian Daniel Bischwandt (died after 1688).
 Frans Cronman, died after 8 May 1655, married Ursula von Knorring (died after 1688), daughter of Colonel Georg Johan von Knorring and Helena Wolf von Lydinghausen.
 Helena Catharina, married Major Gustaf Johan Fransson von Knorring (died 1735).
 Beata Elisabet, died a widow, married Major Anders Rahnhielm (died 1721).
 Juliana, died 1723 at Stockholm, married 1stly Lieutenant-Colonel Fredrik von Marqvard (1640–1705); 2ndly 21 September 1715 at Tobolsk to Lieutenant-Colonel Jakob Svensson Riddersven (1669–1735).
 Fritz Cronman, died before 1680, married Christina Ottilia Börner (died after 1712).
 Johan Fredrik Cronman, died unmarried.
 Charlotta Cronman, died after 1708, married Colonel Henrik Gotthard von Buddenbrock (1648–1727).
 Henrik Magnus von Buddenbrock (1685–1743)
 Lunetta Cronman, married Lieutenant-General Villater.
 Ottiliana Cronman, married a Dorp.
 Sofia Cronman, married Lieutenant-Captain Peter von Gagenholtz.
 Christina Cronman, buried 21 February 1679 at Narva, married Joakim Georg Fredrik von Rohr (died before 1688).

References

External links
Cronman family tree based on Gabriel Anrep and corrected by Gustaf Elgenstierna

1703 deaths
1600s births
17th-century Swedish military personnel
18th-century Swedish military personnel
Swedish people of German descent
Joachim
People from Swedish Livonia
Livonian nobility
Swedish soldiers